Oehme is a German surname. Notable people with the surname include:

 Felix Oehme (born 1981), German yachtsman
 Franziska Oehme (born 1944), German actress
 Ernst Erwin Oehme (1831-1907), German painter
 Ernst Ferdinand Oehme (1797-1855), German painter
 Reinhard Oehme (1928-2010), German-American physicist
 Ulrich Oehme (born 1960), German politician
 Wolfgang Oehme (1930-2011), German-American landscape architect
  Bobby Max Oehme (1964-present) American Entertainer